}}

La loi de la nature is an album that was released by the Cameroonian singer Dynastie Le Tigre on  May 30, 2015 worldwide. A deluxe version of the album was released worldwide on May 26, 2016  by Tiger Prod and was marketed & distributed by  Hope Music Group. The album  is a walk of more than an hour in the heart of African rhythms revisited and modernized by Dynastie and his Dynastie family orchestration. Thereby emerge new musical variations such the Kwatt'nB & the Neo Bikutsi. Alongside these crossbreeding, Dynastie browsed through new genres from elsewhere as Afropop and even R&B.

It has 15 tracks with diverse inspirations from R&B to Afropop to Afrobeat;Many collaborations are found in the album some with young rising Cameroonians  stars Michael Kiessou, X-Maleya, Stanley Enow, Moustik Le Krismatik ). Top Cameroonian music producers such as Mister Kriss, Lucky +2  and musicians like Ben Bass, Michel Mbarga also worked on the album. The main tracks were recorded in Ghetto Music Studios (Messa, Yaoundé) and Ndoumbe Studios (Nlongkak, Yaoundé); mixed and mastered by Christophe Avom.

Background
In 2015, after winning several awards, Dynastie returned working to studios and focusing on his new music. Produced by DJ Kriss, Prend soin d'elle was released on May 30, 2015 and became the first single from the album. Dynastie through the video concept, honored the good willing of catering women and to taking care of daily . To support this move, Dynastie also paid tribute to the famous Sam Fan Thomas's "Makassi dance" . The video was directed by Mr Adrenalyne and world exclusive premier on the Jambo show of Canal 2 International the 23 May 2015 and YouTube on May 30, 2015.

Track listing

References

2015 albums
Albums by Cameroonian artists